Jonathan Stevens (6 January 1977 - 27 December 2013), known as "Dr. Jonny", studied Human Genetics and Biology at Oxford, and worked in medical research. He was diagnosed with Parkinson's at the age of 33. He was a British medical researcher and campaigner for people with Parkinson's disease. He collapsed and died at Christmas 2013. A post mortem found that he had an undiagnosed congenital heart defect. A photography competition now runs in his memory as he himself had a keen interest in photography, which he continued to explore even after his Parkinson's diagnosis.

References

External links
Dialoguewithdisability entry

2013 deaths
British medical researchers
Parkinson's disease
British medical writers
British bloggers
Alumni of the University of Oxford
1977 births